If You Want It, Chile Changes  (Spanish: Si tú quieres, Chile cambia) was a Chilean electoral coalition that brought together a group of Chilean opposition parties (centre to centre-left) to the Chilean presidential, parliamentary and regional advisors elections in 2013. It supported the presidential candidacy of Marco Enríquez-Ominami, who lost the election.

Composition 
The coalition consisted of two political parties and other minor political movements.

References

External links
Presidential campaign of Marco Enríquez-Ominami
Progressive Party
Liberal Party

Political parties established in 2013
Political parties disestablished in 2013
Defunct political party alliances in Chile